Maria Heim is the George Lyman Crosby 1896 & Stanley Warfield Crosby Professor in Religion at Amherst College. She studies ancient Indian intellectual history and literature, with a specialization in the textual traditions of Theravada Buddhism.

Biography 
Heim earned her B.A. from Reed College in 1991, and her Ph.D. from Harvard University in the Sanskrit and Indian Studies Department in 1999. She taught at the California State University, Long Beach, between 1999 and 2003, and has been at Amherst College ever since. She has received grants from the John Simon Guggenheim Memorial Foundation and Fulbright. Heim is on the Editorial Board of the Murty Classical Library of India.

Selected works 
Words for the Heart: A Treasury of Emotions from Classical India. Princeton University Press, 2022.
The Bloomsbury Research Handbook on Emotions in Indian Philosophy. Co-edited volume with Chakravarthi Ram-Prasad and Roy Tzohar, Bloomsbury, 2021. 
Buddhist Ethics. Cambridge: Cambridge University Press Elements in Philosophy Series, 2020.
Voice of the Buddha: Buddhaghosa on the Immeasurable Words. New York: Oxford University Press, 2018. 
The Forerunner of All Things: Buddhaghosa on Mind, Intention, and Agency, New York: Oxford University Press, 2014.
Theories of the Gift in South Asia: Hindu, Buddhist, and Jain Reflections on Dāna, New York: Routledge, 2004.

References 

Amherst College faculty

Living people
Year of birth missing (living people)
California State University, Long Beach faculty
Reed College alumni
Harvard Graduate School of Arts and Sciences alumni